Jayaraman Madanagopal (born 7 November 1974) is an Indian former first-class cricketer. He is now an umpire and has stood in matches in the Ranji Trophy. He stood in his first Twenty20 International (T20I) on 19 November 2021, between India and New Zealand. On 6 October 2022, he stood in his first One Day International (ODI) match, between India and South Africa.

See also
 List of Twenty20 International cricket umpires

References

External links
 

1974 births
Living people
Indian cricketers
Indian cricket umpires
Indian Twenty20 International cricket umpires
Indian One Day International cricket umpires
Tamil Nadu cricketers
Cricketers from Chennai